Razia Said (born December 1, 1959) is a singer, songwriter, and activist from Antalaha, Madagascar.  Razia's music draws on her African influences, such as Fela Kuti and Papa Wemba, while incorporating R&B and Jazz, which she found upon moving to New York City in 1987.    

Razia is a nomad, spending time in Africa, France, Italy, Ibiza, Bali, and New York City. Before recording Zebu Nation, Razia recorded her earlier material, Magical, released in 2006 upon moving to NYC. Despite the excitement of fixing her work to a disc, Razia was unsatisfied.  After many trips back to her home country of Madagascar, Razia had the opportunity to meet with one of the country's most prominent acts, Njava.  Razia's time recording in Madagascar inspired her to write and record songs in the Malagasy languagewhile incorporating many of the familiar sounds and melodies with which she grew up.   

Much of Razia's musical focus is aimed at protecting and preserving the environment, namely that of her homeland.  Razia is an activist fighting illegal logging in Madagascar. An article in Broadway World described her album The Road as "a warm, welcoming set of songs that take us deep into the emotional reality of Razia's self-made, globe-spanning life."

Discography
  Magical (2006)
 Zebu Nation (2010)
 Akory (2015)
 The Road (2018)

References

Further reading
 Billboard magazine article
 MTV Iggy article
 L'Express de Madagascar article
 Exclaim! album review
 Boston Globe album review (subscription required)

1959 births
Living people
20th-century Malagasy women singers
Malagasy environmentalists
Malagasy guitarists
Women guitarists
Women singer-songwriters
21st-century Malagasy women singers